Carminow Cross is a stone Celtic cross near a major road junction southeast of Bodmin in mid-Cornwall, England. Immediately to the north is Castle Canyke, an Iron Age fort. The cross is a Grade II* listed building.

In the late 19th century and early 20th century the cross was half hidden in a hedge at the back of some cottages which then formed the hamlet of Carminow Cross. A. G. Langdon conjectured that its original position was at the crossroads, before it was moved into the hedge.  When road widening was undertaken in the mid-20th century it was moved to its present position surrounded by grass verge.

References

External links

Castle Canyke; themodernantiquarian.com

 

National Heritage List for England
Buildings and structures in Cornwall
Grade II* listed buildings in Cornwall
Celtic crosses
Stone crosses in the United Kingdom
Scheduled monuments in Cornwall